Bill McDonald (born 1967) is an Australian journalist and news presenter.

Career
Previously McDonald had been a sports presenter but was promoted to news presenter when Geoff Mullins left Ten News. He was also a sports presenter on Seven News.

In the summer of January 2010, McDonald presented Ten Early News, Ten Morning News and Ten Weekend News from Sydney.

In 2011, McDonald continued to present 10 News First Queensland and also continued to be the Queensland AFL ground commentator for Ten's national AFL coverage, mainly for matches involving the Brisbane Lions.

McDonald is active in other media and events in Brisbane. He broadcasts daily AFL reports on the Macquarie Southern Cross national radio network daily, as well as his Friday footy tips on Sunshine Coast's 92.7 Mix FM. He's a regular MC at functions and in 2010 was appointed as the Queensland Rugby Club's corporate lunch host until 2012. McDonald has also commentated AFL for Triple M Radio Network and NIRS.

Previously he was also AFL correspondent for the Melbourne's The Age and wrote a weekly AFL column for the Gold Coast Bulletin. McDonald also wrote columns for Brisbane News and Style magazines and co-hosted a live Saturday morning sports show on River 94.9.

McDonald is a professional voice-over artist, performing character voices for radio commercials. Bill along with business partner Kristin Devitt, own a media training company Mas Media (Master the Art of Speaking), focussing on corporate clientele.

In November 2012, McDonald resigned from Network Ten.

In January 2013, McDonald joined the Seven Network and started co-presenting Seven News from Sunday to Thursday with Sharyn Ghidella.

In 2015, Bill co-hosted a documentary while crossing the Kokoda Track in Papua New Guinea, while also filing news reports and live crosses from the jungle along the way. He has completed numerous charity bike rides, runs and even his first marathon on the Gold Coast in 2016 at the age of 49.

In March 2018, McDonald left the Seven Network, to concentrate on network sport and building his own media business billmcdonald.com.au.

For several years, Bill was a member of the Triple M Radio AFL commentary team up until 2016. Prior to that he also commentated on NIRS and prior to that local AFLQ Grand Finals for Channel 7 in the early 1990s.

Personal life
McDonald is married to wife Julianne; in mid 2010 she gave birth to the couple's fourth boy.

References

Living people
Australian television journalists
1967 births
Seven News presenters
10 News First presenters